The Betioky mine is a large iron mine located in Betioky Sud in southern Madagascar, region of Atsimo-Andrefana. Betioky represents one of the largest iron ore reserves in Madagascar and in the world having estimated reserves of 130 million tonnes of ore grading 14% iron metal.

See also 
Mining industry of Madagascar

References 

Iron mines in Madagascar